The First National Assembly of the Philippines (Filipino: Unang Asemblyang Pambansa ng Pilipinas) was the meeting of the legislature of the Commonwealth of the Philippines from November 25, 1935 until August 15, 1938, during the first three years of Manuel L. Quezon's presidency.

Sessions 
 First Special Session: November 25, – December 21, 1935
 First Regular Session: June 16 – October 9, 1936
 Second Special Session: August 28 – September 8, 1937
 Third Special Session: September 9, 1937
 Second Regular Session: January 24 – May 19, 1938
 Fourth Special Session: May 23 – 24, 1938
 Fifth Special Session: July 25 – August 15, 1938

Legislation 
The First National Assembly passed a total of 415 laws: Commonwealth Act Nos. 1 to 415.

Major legislation 
 Commonwealth Act No. 1 – The National Defense Act of 1935
 Commonwealth Act No. 2 – Creation of the National Economic Council
 Commonwealth Act No. 3 – Reorganization of the Supreme Court and the Creation of the Court of Appeals
 Commonwealth Act No. 5 – Reorganization of the Executive Departments and the Creation of the Budget Commission
 Commonwealth Act No. 7 – Creation of the National Loan and Investment Board
 Commonwealth Act No. 20 – Agrarian Reform Act of 1936
 Commonwealth Act No. 34 – Setting the Date of April 30, 1937, for the Plebiscite of the Constitutional Amendments pertaining to Women's Suffrage
 Commonwealth Act No. 39 – Charter of the City of Zamboanga
 Commonwealth Act No. 51 – Charter of the City of Davao
 Commonwealth Act No. 58 – Charter of the City of Cebu
 Commonwealth Act No. 85 – Amendment to the Provincial and Municipal Appropriations Act
 Commonwealth Act No. 103 – Creation of the Court of Industrial Relations
 Commonwealth Act No. 104 – Authorizing the Secretary of Labor to Promulgate and Enforce Regulations and the Establishment of Safety Standards for Laborers and Employees working in Quarries and Mines
 Commonwealth Act No. 118 – The Philippine Livestock Promotion Fund Act of 1936
 Commonwealth Act No. 120 – The National Power Corporation Act of 1936
 Commonwealth Act No. 177 – Extension of the Civil Service Commission
 Commonwealth Act No. 184 – Creation of the Institute of National Language
 Commonwealth Act No. 186 – Creation of the Government Insurance Service System
 Commonwealth Act No. 192 – Creation of the National Produce Exchange
 Commonwealth Act No. 238 – Abolition of the Cedula or Poll Tax
 Commonwealth Act No. 234 – Appropriations for Primary Education
 Commonwealth Act No. 240 – Appropriations for New Elementary School Buildings
 Commonwealth Act No. 242 – Compensation for Lost Cedula Revenues
 Commonwealth Act No. 246 – General Appropriations Act of 1936
 Commonwealth Act No. 328 – Charter of the City of Bacolod
 Commonwealth Act No. 343 – Abolition of the State Force Police and the Re-Creation of the Philippine Constabulary
 Commonwealth Act No. 381 – Creating A Level of Three Years of Immediate Education for Children and its Appropriations

Leadership 
 Speaker:
Gil M. Montilla (NP, 3rd District, Negros Occidental)
 Floor Leader:
José E. Romero (NP, 2nd District, Negros Oriental)

Members 

Notes

See also 
 National Assembly of the Philippines
 1935 Philippine general election

External links

Further reading 
 Philippine House of Representatives Congressional Library
 
 

National Assembly of the Philippines